The Lord Mayor of Sheffield is a ceremonial post held by a member of Sheffield City Council.  They are elected annually by the council.  The post originated in 1843, with the appointment of William Jeffcock as the first Mayor of Sheffield.  Early mayors had significant powers and chaired both council meetings and the bench of magistrates.

In 1855, the then-mayor was refused a good seat at the opening of the Paris Exhibition, as he did not have a chain of office.  As a result, one was purchased the following year, and this has remained in use.

In 1897, in the same year as the opening of Sheffield Town Hall, the mayor was given the right to style himself the "Lord Mayor".  To mark this, the first Lord Mayor, Henry Fitzalan-Howard, 15th Duke of Norfolk, gave the Sheffield Mace to the city to mark the royal authority invested in the post.

The Lord Mayor has the use of the Lord Mayor's Parlour in Sheffield Town Hall, an official badge and the honorary presidency of several organisations.  The Lord Mayor's Awards and the Lord Mayor's Charity Fund are local institutions organised in the name of the Lord Mayor.

Ann Eliza Longden was the first female Lord Mayor (1936–7).

Notable former mayors include George Bassett, founder of a confectionery firm, and the steelmaker Mark Firth.

List of mayors of Sheffield

List of lord mayors of Sheffield

Notes

References

Sheffield